Gustav Hentschel (July 5, 1896 – June 7, 1980) was an American cyclist. He competed in two events at the 1924 Summer Olympics.

References

External links
 

1896 births
1980 deaths
American male cyclists
Olympic cyclists of the United States
Cyclists at the 1924 Summer Olympics
Cyclists from Chicago